Bodybuilding in Australia traces its early history to the 1940s. In 1947 the first large scale national bodybuilding contest was held, and since then bodybuilding has continued to grow within Australia. It has diversified from originally being largely male-dominated to having equal, or in some instances more, women competitors. Australia has both produced high performing bodybuilders, such as Lee Priest, and also hosted some historically significant events in the field, such as the IFBB Mr Olympia in 1980 where Arnold Schwarzenegger was the winner.

Today there are numerous governing bodies within Australia that promote competitions. Some of which are recognised for their actions in drug testing athletes and enforcing bans for anti-doping violations.

History 

 The 1947 Mr Australia contest was the first large scale national bodybuilding competition. Promoters such as Fred Vella were instrumental in the advent of annual contests which would further the development of competitive bodybuilding in Australia. Early competitions were heavily dominated by male competitors however the rise of female bodybuilding throughout the 1970s and 1980s resulted in many instances of greater numbers of women competing than men.
 Male Australian bodybuilders have performed extremely well overseas at major international events such as the NABBA Mr Universe, most recently with Lee Priest winning the Overall title in 2013. Female Australian bodybuilders have likewise been no stranger to the spotlight, however due to the often obscure nature of women's bodybuilding, female competitors are less widely promoted.
 One of the most famous Australian female bodybuilders was Bev Francis who was a top competitor at the Ms Olympia competition in the 1980s and early 1990s. Her success was limited in the early stages of her career because some judges viewed her as too muscular. This was covered extensively in the documentary film, Pumping Iron II: The Women.

In 1980, Arnold Schwarzenegger won the IFBB Mr. Olympia, which was hosted in Sydney at the Sydney Opera House by Paul Graham.

Governance 

 Bodybuilding within Australia is governed by several competing organisations, each affiliated to a larger international organisation.
 In the early years of Australian bodybuilding individual promoters were responsible for producing events. Over time, groups of promoters began forming affiliations with one another and creating associations. The United Body-Builders of Australia and Rocco Oppedisano's Pacific Body Building International are two such examples.

Bodybuilding Governing bodies
Within Australia there are numerous governing bodies each independently promoting competitions. 
ANB
IFBB 
INBA
Musclemania
NABBA
WBFF
WFF
WNBF

Drug Testing 
Following periodic bans introduced by the IOC and the IFBB campaigning for bodybuilding to become and Olympic Sport, the focus on anti-doping and natural competitions increased. Natural bodybuilding competitions started to take place in the country during the 1990s, however actual drug testing was not included until much later. Some organisations administer drug testing through the Australian Sports Anti-Doping Authority. The extent of this is generally unknown, however the INBA has been recognised for its decision to ban athletes for anti-doping violations.

See also

Mr. Australia
INBA - International Natural Bodybuilding Association
Sport in Australia
Sport in Oceania

References